Dick Norman was the defending champion, but chose to compete in Monte Carlo instead.Santiago González won in the final 3–6, 6–1, 7–5 against Michał Przysiężny.

Seeds

Draw

Finals

Top half

Bottom half

References
Main Draw
Qualifying Singles

Abierto Internacional del Bicentenario Leon - Singles
2010 Singles